Diplomats is a 1918 German silent film directed by Harry Piel. It features the detective Joe Deebs.

Cast
 Max Ruhbeck
 Heinrich Schroth as Joe Deebs

References

Bibliography

External links

1918 films
Films of the Weimar Republic
Films directed by Harry Piel
German silent feature films
German black-and-white films
1910s German films